Torbjørn Sittrup Bergerud (born 16 July 1994) is a Norwegian handball player for Kolstad Håndball and the Norwegian national team.

International honours
World Championship:
: 2017, 2019
European Championship:
: 2020

References

External links
 
 
 Torbjørn Bergerud at the Norwegian Handball Federation 
 
 

1994 births
Living people
Norwegian people of Danish descent
Norwegian male handball players
Handball-Bundesliga players
Norwegian expatriate sportspeople in Denmark
Norwegian expatriate sportspeople in Germany
Norwegian expatriate sportspeople in Sweden
Expatriate handball players
Sportspeople from Drammen
Lugi HF players
TTH Holstebro players
SG Flensburg-Handewitt players
Kolstad Håndball players

Handball players at the 2020 Summer Olympics
Olympic handball players of Norway